Barry Leonard Roberts (born 15 June 1946) is a former New Zealand cricketer who played first-class and List A cricket for Northern Districts in 1977–78.

In his only List A match, Barry Roberts opened the batting for Northern Districts and made 33 not out as he and Dennis Lloyd successfully chased Auckland's total of 70 without losing a wicket. He has been prominent in Hawke Cup cricket since the 1960s. He played in the Marlborough team that won the title in 1967-68 for the first time, and the Taranaki team that won the title in 1970-71 and held it for two seasons. He also later played Hawke Cup cricket for Franklin and Hamilton. He returned to Marlborough in 1982, and coached the team for most of the time from then till 2005, including their second title victory in 1993–94. He was awarded life membership of the Marlborough Cricket Association in 2019.

References

External links
 
 Barry Roberts at CricketArchive

1946 births
Living people
New Zealand cricketers
Northern Districts cricketers
Sportspeople from Suva
New Zealand cricket coaches